Nina Woodford-Wells is a Swedish-American songwriter.

Career 
Nina Woodford (born 13 July 1979) Stockholm, is the daughter of the Swedish music producer Sten Sandahl, and the Black American social anthropologist Prudence Woodford-Berger. At the age of 16, she began her career singing backing vocals for Swedish artists Eric Gadd, Titiyo, and The Navigators. She also featured on the Britney Spears album Oops!... I Did It Again. By the age of 20 she had a publishing deal as a songwriter with Murlyn Music in Stockholm.

At age 25, Woodford moved to London, and wrote the European Hot 100 #1 smash hit, Broken Strings, by James Morrison from his album Songs for You, Truths for Me. The song is the biggest single of Morrison's career.

Nina co-wrote the theme song for the 2019 Special Olympics held in Abu Dhabi, titled "Right Where I'm Supposed To Be".  Nina was tapped by Sesame Street in 2021 to compose a song honoring Juneteenth, a federal holiday in the United States commemorating the emancipation of African-American slaves. She has also written for Leona Lewis, Idina Menzel, Tom Jones, Sugababes, Sophie Ellis-Bextor, Christina Milian, The Saturdays, and Jay Sean. Woodford noted that Kate Bush "makes me feel free to dare to try different things. There are very few women who write that kind of direct poetry".

Personal life
Nina grew up in Stockholm's Södermalm borough. Today she lives in Los Angeles and is married to record producer Greg Wells.

Honours 
 2010 SKAP prize, an award designated to Swedish pop music writers.

References

External links
 All Music - credits.

1979 births
Living people
Swedish songwriters
Swedish composers
Musicians from Stockholm
Swedish people of African-American descent
African-American women singer-songwriters
African-American musicians
21st-century African-American people
21st-century African-American women
20th-century African-American people
20th-century African-American women